The 370s decade ran from January 1, 370, to December 31, 379.

Significant people

References